Ernesto Almirante (24 September 1877 – 13 December 1964) was an Italian film and stage actor.

Life and career 
Born in Mistretta into a family of actors, Almirante worked several years on stage along his father Nunzio. He was also active as agent and organizer of several stage companies.

After an occasional film role in the 1919 mute film Federica d'Illirio, starting from mid-1930s Almirante became one of the most active character actors of his time. In 1955 he retired from acting and moved into a retirement home for actors in Bologna. He was the uncle of politician Giorgio Almirante.

Partial filmography 

 Federica d'Illiria (1919)
 Red Passport (1935) - L'addetto di passaporto clandestini
 At Your Orders, Madame (1939) - Lorot, l'impiegato del notaio
 We Were Seven Widows (1939) - L'anziano capitano della nave
 Defendant, Stand Up! (1939) - André Copersche, il presidente del tribunal
 La mia canzone al vento (1939)
 The Document (1939)
 The Night of Tricks (1939) - Francesco Acquaviva
 One Hundred Thousand Dollars (1940) - Michele Zilay
 La granduchessa si diverte (1940)
 A Romantic Adventure (1940) - Berni, il socio di Luigi
 Piccolo alpino (1940) - Il professore
 The Daughter of the Green Pirate (1940) - Il precettore delle educante
 Manovre d'amore (1940) - Enchelly
 Marco Visconti (1941) - Tremacoldo
 Brivido (1941) - Isidoro Janosky
 The Adventuress from the Floor Above (1941) - Il padre de Biancamaria
 Honeymoon (1941) - Ernesto Gelardi
 Finalmente soli (1942) - Il professore Ippolito Mariani
 Margherita fra i tre (1942) - Giovanni
 Wedding Day (1942) - La zio dello sposo
 Mater dolorosa (1943) - Il nobiluoimo anziano al concerto
 Il nostro prossimo (1943)
 In cerca di felicità (1944) - Brocca
 O sole mio (1946)
 The Testimony (1946) - Giuseppe Marchi
 L'angelo e il diavolo (1946)
 Tempesta d'anime (1946)
 To Live in Peace (1947) - Il Nonno
 L'onorevole Angelina (1947) - Luigi
 The Captain's Daughter (1947) - Savelich
 The Brothers Karamazov (1947) - Maximoff
 Difficult Years (1948) - Il nonno
 Eleven Men and a Ball (1948) - Il professore
 Ti ritroverò (1949) - The Old Fisherman
 The Firemen of Viggiù (1949) - Uno spettatore
 Alarm Bells (1949) - Il possidente
 The Bride Can't Wait (1949)
 I'm in the Revue (1950) - Le colonel
 Father's Dilemma (1950) - L'invitato anziano
 The White Line (1950) - The Grandfather
 That Ghost of My Husband (1950)
 Cops and Robbers (1951) - Esposito's Father
 Ergastolo (1952) - Prof. Arlotta
 The White Sheik (1952) - Dottore Fortuna - il regista del fotoromanzo
 Toto and the King of Rome (1952) - Nedo
 Matrimonial Agency (1953) - Zio di Lodolini
 100 Years of Love (1954) - Antonio Bianchi (segment "Nozze d'Oro")
 Via Padova 46 (1954) - Cesare
 Ore 10: lezione di canto (1955) - Il Prof. Tapparelli
 Destination Piovarolo (1955) - Ernesto
 Il coraggio (1955) - Salvatore Esposito (final film role)

References

External links 

 
 

1877 births
1964 deaths
20th-century Italian male actors
Italian male film actors
Italian male stage actors
Actors from the Province of Messina